Morkill may refer to:

Morkill River, British Columbia, Canada
Mount Morkill, Alberta and British Columbia, Canada
Richard Dalby Morkill (fl. 1873–1875), mayor of Sherbrooke, Quebec, Canada